Szulc is a Polish surname, a version of the German surname Schulz. Notable people with the surname include:

 Dominik Szulc (1787–1860), Polish philosopher and historian
 Jakub Szulc (born 1973), Polish politician
 Jarosław Marek Rymkiewicz, born as Jarosław Marek Szulc (born 1935), a Polish poet, essayist, dramatist and literary critic
 Josef Szulc (Josef Szulc, 1875–1956), French composer and conductor, of Polish descent
 Karola Szulc (born 1866), birth name of  Caroline Schultze,  a Polish female physician who worked in France
 Michel Szulc-Krzyzanowski (born 1949), Dutch photographic artist
 Tad Szulc (Tadeusz Witold Szulc, 1926–2001), American reporter and writer of non-fiction books, of Polish descent

See also

Polish-language surnames
Jewish surnames